Keith Spaith (April 8, 1923 – March 1, 1976) was a Canadian football player for the Calgary Stampeders from 1948 to 1954.

Early life 
Spaith was born in Dinuba, California. He played college football with Saint Mary's College of California and later transferred to University of Southern California.

Career 
In 1947, Spaith played one season in the Pacific Coast Professional Football League, with the Hawaiian Warriors. His team finished 7–2 and won the league title, though it was later discovered that players had bet on games. Spaith was one of 14 suspended.

Western Interprovincial Football Union 
Spaith joined the Calgary Stampeders in 1948. In his rookie season he led the Stamps to an undefeated 12–0 record (the last team in Canadian professional football to do so) and won the Grey Cup. In that victory he played all 60 minutes, and even intercepted a pass. He was also an all-star and winner of the Jeff Nicklin Memorial Trophy as best player in the west. In 1949 the Cowboys went 13–1 but lost the Grey Cup to the Montreal Alouettes. Regardless, once again Spaith was an all-star and MVP award winner. The Stamps, under his leadership, had a 25-win and 1-loss regular season record in his first two years.

Spaith played five more seasons with Calgary. He completed 555 of 1166 passes for 8906 yards, with 23 touchdown passes and 52 interceptions. He also punted 397 times.

After his football career, he returned to the United States and worked in the construction business.

Personal life 
Spaith and his wife Betty and two sons and a daughter. His oldest son, Robert Spaith, is a well-known sculptor in Alberta, Canada. He died, age 52, in March 1976. In 2002, he was inducted into the Stampeders Alumni Wall of Fame.

References

External links
Just Sports Stats

1923 births
1976 deaths
American football quarterbacks
Canadian football quarterbacks
American players of Canadian football
Saint Mary's Gaels football players
Sportspeople from Tulare County, California
USC Trojans football players
Calgary Stampeders players
Players of American football from California
People from Dinuba, California